7 Avenue Southwest is a planned and approved CTrain light rail station in Calgary, Alberta, Canada part of the Green Line. Construction will begin in 2024 and complete in 2027 as part of construction stage one, phase one.

The station is underground in the city's high density urban core at the intersection of 7 Avenue / 2 Street SW. It will be the busiest station on the Green Line, and is the primary transfer point to the existing Red Line and Blue Line. The station will also connect riders to the Calgary International Airport via BRT Route 300 and the southwestern bus rapid transit (BRT) transitway via MAX Yellow. 

The station is surrounded by numerous high density commercial, residential, retail and mixed-use towers, and is near some of Calgary's most iconic skyscrapers that define the city's skyline, such as the Telus Sky, The Bow, the Calgary Tower, and Brookfield Place.  Also near the station is Stephen Avenue, the Central Library, Arts Commons, the CORE Centre, City Hall, Devonian Gardens, the University of Calgary downtown campus, SAIT Culinary Campus and Bow Valley College.

References 

CTrain stations
Railway stations scheduled to open in 2027
Railway stations located underground in Canada